Pablo Tell Schreiber (born April 26, 1978) is a Canadian-American actor. He is best known for his stage work and for portraying Nick Sobotka on The Wire (2003), William Lewis on Law & Order: Special Victims Unit (2013–2014), Mad Sweeney on Starz series American Gods (2017–2020), and as George "Pornstache" Mendez on Orange Is the New Black (2013–2017), for which he received a Primetime Emmy nomination for Outstanding Guest Actor in a Drama Series. He stars as Master Chief in the Paramount+ live-action series Halo (2022–present) which is based on the franchise of the same name. 

His film roles include minor roles in Bubble Boy (2001), The Manchurian Candidate (2004), Lords of Dogtown (2005), Vicky Cristina Barcelona (2008), Nights in Rodanthe (2008), Allegiance (2012), and Preservation (2014). He co-starred in the 2016 war film 13 Hours: The Secret Soldiers of Benghazi directed by Michael Bay. In 2018, he starred in the action heist film Den of Thieves opposite Gerard Butler and in Skyscraper with Dwayne Johnson. In 2020, he starred in the drama film Lorelei with Jena Malone.

He is also known for his dramatic stage work including his performance in Awake and Sing! (2006) on Broadway which earned him a nomination for a Tony Award. In 2008, he starred in reasons to be pretty where he won the 2009 Drama Desk Award for Outstanding Featured Actor in a Play. He narrated the audiobook version of Brett Easton Ellis’ American Psycho.

Early life
Schreiber was born to parents Tell Carroll Schreiber (1941–2021), an American actor, and Lorraine Reaveley, a Canadian body-based psychotherapist. He was born in a hippie commune in Ymir, British Columbia and he and his family moved to the unincorporated rural community of Winlaw, British Columbia when he was six months old. His older half-brother is actor Liev Schreiber with whom he shares a father.

Schreiber's father, having a strong interest in literature, named Pablo after Chilean poet Pablo Neruda. His parents separated when he was 12 and Schreiber moved to Seattle with his father.

After high school Schreiber enrolled at the University of San Francisco hoping to win a spot on its basketball team. He later transferred to Carnegie Mellon University in Pittsburgh and graduated in 2000 with a degree in theatre.

Career

Television
Schreiber's first television appearance was as Nick Sobotka in season 2 of the critically acclaimed HBO series The Wire (2003). After his final appearance in the last episode of season 2, he also made a cameo appearance in the season 5 episode "The Dickensian Aspect". He went on to play minor roles in the series Law & Order: Criminal Intent and Law & Order before playing the recurring guest role of serial rapist William Lewis on Law & Order: Special Victims Unit. He appeared in an eight episode arc playing the antagonist to Olivia Benson's (Mariska Hargitay) character.

From 2008 to 2009, he appeared in multiple series including Dirt, Army Wives, The Beast, Numbers, and It's Always Sunny in Philadelphia. In 2011, he was cast as Johnny Leary in the FX series Lights Out which only aired for one season. From 2011 to 2012, he played both Demetri Ravitch in the HBO series Weeds and Anton Little Creek on the show A Gifted Man. BuddyTV ranked him #77 on its list of "TV's Sexiest Men of 2011".

In October 2012, Schreiber was cast in the recurring role of George "Pornstache" Mendez on the Netflix original drama series Orange Is the New Black. For his role on the show, he won the "We Love to Hate You Award" at the 2014 Young Hollywood Awards and received a Primetime Emmy nomination for Outstanding Guest Actor in a Drama Series in 2015. He played the role from 2013 to 2017 and had a guest appearance in a 2019 episode.

In February 2013, he co-starred as Virgil in NBC's drama pilot Ironside, a reboot of the 1967 series of the same name. However ratings and reviews were unfavorable and it was canceled after only four episodes had aired.

Schreiber was cast as Mad Sweeney in the 2017 Starz's series American Gods, based on the novel of the same name written by Neil Gaiman. His character is a self-described leprechaun that is endebted to Mr. Wednesday who is played by Ian McShane. By the end of season 2, Sweeney remembers that he is Buile Shuibhne, the king of the Dál nAraidi who was driven insane by the curse of Saint Rónán Finn. Schreiber appears in seasons 1 and 2 with flashback appearances in the third and final season. His character becomes a fan-favorite for viewers during the series.

In April 2019, he was cast as Master Chief / John-117 in the Halo live-action series, based on the video game franchise of the same name. The series was released on March 24, 2022, by Paramount+ and has received mostly positive reviews with getting a 71% on Rotten Tomatoes. To prepare for his role in the series, Schreiber worked with a trainer and a chef to bulk up adding muscle to play the supersoldier. Paramount confirmed that the series was renewed for season 2 with Schreiber reprising the main role of Master Chief.

Schreiber co-starred in the biographical crime drama streaming television miniseries Candy as Allan Gore, opposite Jessica Biel's character, Candy Montgomery. It is based on the true story of how Candy Montgomery was accused of the axe murder of her neighbor, Betty Gore in 1980 in Texas. The series premiered May 9, 2022, with the last episodes airing on May 13, 2022.

Film
Schreiber's first film was a minor role in the 2001 American black comedy film Bubble Boy. He appeared in the 2004 film The Manchurian Candidate which starred his half-brother Liev Schreiber. He had supporting roles in the films Lords of Dogtown (2005), Vicky Cristina Barcelona (2008), Nights in Rodanthe (2008),  and Happythankyoumoreplease (2010). In 2016, he co-starred as Kris "Tanto" Paronto, GRS team member and former U.S. Army Ranger in the American biographical war film 13 Hours: The Secret Soldiers of Benghazi, opposite John Krasinski and James Badge Dale. The film was directed and co-produced by Michael Bay, written by Chuck Hogan, and is based on Mitchell Zuckoff's 2014 book of the same name.

In 2018, he starred in the American action heist film Den of Thieves with Gerard Butler. He played Ray Merrimen, a MARSOC Marine veteran who is the crew's leader and schemer, and one of the robbers who sets out to rob the Federal Reserve Bank of downtown Los Angeles. Schreiber underwent extensive military training for his role in the film, saying "... with the weapons training, we had extensive military movement, team movement, weapons training boot camp, a couple of weeks before we started shooting". In the same year he co-starred with Dwayne Johnson in the action thriller film Skyscraper. He played the role of American astronaut Jim Lovell in the biographical drama First Man which was also released in 2018.

Schreiber starred in the 2021 drama film Lorelei with Jena Malone. It received mostly positive reviews from critics. Brian Tallerico from RogerEbert.com said of Schreiber, "Schreiber uses his massive size in an interesting way in that he’s such an imposing figure but he allows himself to also be fascinatingly vulnerable at the same time... He has remarkable range".

Theater
Schreiber's stage work includes both Broadway and off-Broadway plays. In 2006, he starred in the Broadway play Awake and Sing!, earning him a nomination for a Tony Award for Best Featured Actor in a Play. He also starred in the 2008 Broadway play reasons to be pretty with Piper Perabo and Alison Pill. For that role he won the 2009 Drama Desk Award for Outstanding Featured Actor in a Play. He played Eben in the 2009 play Desire Under the Elms opposite Carla Gugino's Abbie. In 2011, Schreiber starred in the Off-Broadway play Gruesome Playground Injuries at Second Stage Theatre.

Personal life 
Schreiber married yoga teacher Jessica Monty in 2007. She filed for divorce in 2014 citing irreconcilable differences. They have two sons together, born in 2009 and 2012.

Filmography

Film

Television

Video games

Audiobooks

Explanatory notes

References

External links
 
 
 

21st-century American male actors
21st-century Canadian male actors
American male film actors
American male stage actors
American male television actors
American male voice actors
American people of Canadian descent
American people of German descent
Canadian male film actors
Canadian male stage actors
Canadian male television actors
Canadian male voice actors
Canadian people of American descent
Canadian people of German descent
Carnegie Mellon University College of Fine Arts alumni
Drama Desk Award winners
Living people
Male actors from British Columbia
Male actors from Seattle
People from the Regional District of Central Kootenay
People from Sullivan County, New York
Audiobook narrators
1978 births